Brachodes funebris is a moth of the family Brachodidae. It is found in France, Portugal and Spain.

References

Moths described in 1833
Brachodidae
Moths of Europe